The South African Railways Class MH 2-6-6-2 of 1915 was an articulated Mallet-design steam locomotive.

In 1915, the South African Railways placed five Class MH Mallet articulated compound steam locomotives with a 2-6-6-2 wheel arrangement in coal hauling service.

Manufacturer
During 1914, the requirement for locomotives with a high tractive effort to cope with the increasing volume of coal traffic between Witbank and Germiston led to the introduction of a heavy Mallet compound superheated engine with a 2-6-6-2 wheel arrangement.

The Class MH Mallet articulated locomotive was designed in detail in the locomotive drawing office in Pretoria under the personal direction of D.A. Hendrie, Chief Mechanical Engineer (CME) of the South African Railways (SAR) from 1910 to 1922. The draughtsman, specially detached for the work, was J.R. Boyer who was later to become the Chief Locomotive Draughtsman of the SAR. Five of these very large locomotives were ordered from North British Locomotive Company and delivered in 1915, numbered in the range from 1661 to 1665. They were erected in the Salvokop shops in Pretoria and were placed in service in September 1915.

Characteristics
The hind part of this frame was rigidly secured to the boiler through the high-pressure cylinder saddle castings and terminated just in front of the firebox outer throat plate. From this point rearwards, the frame was of the plate type and arranged to carry the spring gear and other fittings for the trailing Bissel truck.

The locomotives were superheated and had Walschaerts valve gear, controlled by steam reversing gear. The cylinders and steam chests were formed in three separate castings. The high-pressure cylinders were arranged with piston valves, while the low-pressure cylinders were arranged with Richardson balanced type slide valves, arranged above the cylinders. The steam chest covers of the low-pressure cylinders were designed with inclined joint faces to facilitate the handling of the valve and refacing of the ports during servicing.

At the time of their introduction, the Class MH was the largest and most powerful locomotive in the world on Cape gauge. It attracted the attention of locomotive engineers throughout the world as an outstanding achievement for locomotive power on  gauge.

The Class MH was almost certainly capable of exerting more than  tractive effort at starting.

Service
They were initially placed in service on the coal line between Witbank and Germiston as intended to supplement the other Mallets already working on that line. In the 1930s they were transferred to Natal to work on the line between Vryheid and Glencoe, also hauling coal. They were outstanding in their performance and remained in Natal for the rest of their service lives until they were all retired and scrapped by 1940.

Illustration

References

2280
2280
2-6-6-2 locomotives
(1C)C1 locomotives
NBL locomotives
Cape gauge railway locomotives
Railway locomotives introduced in 1915
1915 in South Africa
Scrapped locomotives